Burnette Rock is a rock  high, lying  northwest of Groves Island, off the coast of Marie Byrd Land. It was named for Chief Warrant Officer Desmond Burnette, US Army, a helicopter pilot on the Marie Byrd Land Traverse, 1966–67. He was pilot of the first helicopter to land on this rock during the mapping control traverse with United States Geological Survey (USGS) topographic engineers. The name was suggested to the Advisory Committee on Antarctic Names by Charles E. Morrison, Jr., USGS, who with Burnette, Thomas Bray, USGS, and Sergeant Donald Bunner, US Army, occupied and positioned this rock on December 4, 1966.

References 

Rock formations of Marie Byrd Land